Sebastian Dudek (born 19 January 1980) is a Polish professional footballer who plays for Warta Kamieńskie Młyny as a midfielder.

During the 2011–12 UEFA Europa League, he scored a top corner goal against Dundee United, which secured his team's place in the next round.

Career
His career began in 1998, when he joined the team Promień Żary.

Honours
Śląsk Wrocław
 Ekstraklasa: 2011–12
Ekstraklasa Cup: 2009

Zawisza Bydgoszcz
 Polish Cup: 2013–14

References

External links
 

1980 births
Living people
People from Żary
Sportspeople from Lubusz Voivodeship
Association football midfielders
Polish footballers
Promień Żary players
Śląsk Wrocław players
Widzew Łódź players
Zawisza Bydgoszcz players
Zagłębie Sosnowiec players
Polonia Bytom players
Ekstraklasa players
I liga players
II liga players
III liga players
IV liga players